Bohuslav Beránek (25 March 1946 – 5 October 2007) was an orienteering competitor who competed for Czechoslovakia. At the 1970 World Orienteering Championships in Eisenach he won a bronze medal in the relay, together with Zdenek Lenhart, Jaroslav Jasek and Svatoslav Galik. He lived in Pilsen.

References

Living people
Czechoslovak orienteers
Male orienteers
Foot orienteers
World Orienteering Championships medalists
1946 births